Vijay Raaz (born 5 June 1963) is an Indian actor, film director and narrator, who predominantly appears in Hindi films. He debuted with Bhopal Express (1999) and since worked in more than 90 films. His breakthrough came when he played the role of Dubeyji in the movie Monsoon Wedding in 2001. Raaz garnered recognition for his comedic role in Run (2004) and Dhamaal (2007). He is noted for playing gangster roles in Delhi Belly (2011) and Dedh Ishqiya (2014) as well as other notable films include Stree (2018), Zoya Akhtar's Gully Boy (2019), Lootcase (2020), Sanjay Leela Bhansali's Gangubai Kathiawadi (2022). In 2014, he debuted as a director with Kya Dilli Kya Lahore. His gruff baritone voice has been used in voice-over work, including films and commercials.

Early life and career

Raaz was born in Delhi on 5 June 1963. During his studies at  P.G.D.A.V. College,  University of Delhi, he was a part of the dramatic society. He decided to focus on film career and moved to Mumbai where he gained a small but significant role in Ram Gopal Varma's Jungle. Vijay Raaz did a cameo in Jaspal Bhatti's famous series 'Flop Show' episode 1.Naseeruddin Shah had seen him perform at the NSD and recommended him to Mahesh Mathai for Bhopal Express and to Mira Nair for Monsoon Wedding. After the success of Monsoon Wedding, Raaz received many roles. His first mainstream film cast as the leading actor was Raghu Romeo, a box-office success where Raaz depicts the life of a confused lower-class Indian fellow.

Raaz garnered recognition for his comedic role in the 2004 film Run. In 2011, he played a ruthless gangster in Delhi Belly. His gruff baritone voice has been used in voice-over work, including films and commercials.

Filmography

References

External links
 
 Vijay Raaz: Filmography

Indian male film actors
Living people
People from Delhi
Kirori Mal College alumni
1963 births